The Japanese name Shigure is noteworthy in several contexts:

 Asa Shigure or Ama Shigure, characters from the Shuffle! series of games/anime
 Shigure Sohma, from the Fruits Basket anime
 Japanese destroyer Shigure, two Imperial Japanese Navy destroyers
 a Rain Ninja Genin in Naruto
 Shigure, a major character in the Japanese anime series, Ninja Scroll
 Shigure, a demon surgeon from the Yu Yu Hakusho series
 Shigure Kōsaka, a mysterious female ninja from the manga and anime series Shijō Saikyō no Deshi Kenichi
 Shigure Yukimi, a soldier from the Seraph of the End series
 Shigure Soen, the sword style that Takeshi Yamamoto uses in the anime series, Reborn!